His Greatest Bluff (German: Sein größter Bluff) is a 1927 German silent comedy film directed by Henrik Galeen and Harry Piel and starring Piel, Toni Tetzlaff and Lotte Lorring. Its title is sometimes translated as His Biggest Bluff. Today, the film is best known for the early role it offered to Marlene Dietrich who was only cast after great effort by her agents. The film was shot at the Grunewald Studios, located in Western Berlin, during January and February 1927. It premiered on 12 May 1927 at the Alhambra-Palast in Berlin.

Cast

References

Bibliography
 Bach, Steven. Marlene Dietrich: Life and Legend. University of Minnesota Press, 2011
 Gemünden, Gerd & Desjardins, Mary R. Dietrich Icon. Duke University Press, 2007.

External links

1927 films
Films of the Weimar Republic
German silent feature films
1927 comedy films
German comedy films
Films directed by Henrik Galeen
Films directed by Harry Piel
Films produced by Seymour Nebenzal
German black-and-white films
Silent comedy films
1920s German films